Jacqueline "Jackie" Hope Glass (born 1984) is an American politician and consultant from Virginia. A Democrat, she was first elected to the Virginia House of Delegates in a special election in 2022, winning the seat vacated by retiring Delegate Jay Jones. Glass represents the 89th district, which covers part of the city of Norfolk (including Downtown Norfolk).

Early life and education 
Glass was born in Chicago, Illinois. She earned a Bachelor of Science degree in workforce education training and development from the Southern Illinois University Carbondale in 2014.

Career 
In 2002, at the age of 19, Glass enlisted in the United States Navy and served until 2013, specializing in cryptography.

After graduating from college, Glass moved to Norfolk, Virginia, and has worked as a diversity, equity, and inclusion consultant and instructional system designer. Glass is a member of the NAACP Norfolk branch, the Black Chamber of Commerce, and the Community Emergency Response Team. She was president of the Ballentine Civic League, a board member of Reading Enriches All Children (REACH), a board member of the Young Investors Group, and an ambassador to the United State of Women Summit.

Local politics 
On May 1, 2018, Glass ran for a seat on the Norfolk School Board, placing second with 38.6% of the vote, just 1.9% behind Carlos Clanton. On November 2, 2021, Glass ran in a special election for a seat on the Norfolk City Council, again placing second with 25.8% of the vote behind incumbent Danica Royster.

2022 Virginia House of Delegates special election 
On January 11, 2022, Glass ran in the special election for the 89th district held to replace retiring incumbent Jay Jones. She won with 76.4% of the vote, defeating Republican Giovanni Dolmo.

References 

Living people
African-American women in politics
Women state legislators in Virginia
Democratic Party members of the Virginia House of Delegates
21st-century American politicians
21st-century American women politicians
Politicians from Norfolk, Virginia
1984 births
Politicians from Chicago
Southern Illinois University Carbondale alumni
American cryptographers